Fred Taylor (18 December 1918 – 13 February 1991) was an  Australian rules footballer who played with St Kilda in the Victorian Football League (VFL).

Notes

External links 

1918 births
1991 deaths
Australian rules footballers from Victoria (Australia)
St Kilda Football Club players
Prahran Football Club players